Kilmacrenan, sometimes spelled Kilmacrennan, is a barony in County Donegal, Republic of Ireland. Baronies were mainly cadastral rather than administrative units, which acquired modest local taxation and spending functions in the 19th century before being superseded by higher units under the Local Government (Ireland) Act 1898. Kilmacrenan is the largest barony in Ireland by land area.

Etymology
Kilmacrenan takes its name from Kilmacrenan village, in Irish Cill Mhic Réanáin or 'Cill Mhic nÉanáin'', "church of the sons of Eanan."

Geography

Kilmacrenan is located in the north of County Donegal, to the west and north of Lough Swilly and the River Swilly. With an area of 312,410 acres, it is the largest barony in Ireland.

History

Kilmacrenan was the ancient territory of the O'Donnell kings of Tyrconnell, O'Breislein (O'Breslin), Mac Sweeneys, O'Begley, O'Friel, O'Kernaghan of Clondavaddog, McCoyle of Mevagh, O'Toner of Tullyfern and O'Laherty (Laverty). Clann Chinnfhaelaidh is in the eastern portion of the barony. The barony of Kilmacrenan was founded by 1672.

List of settlements

Below is a list of settlements in Kilmacrenan barony: 
Bunbeg
Carrowkeel
Creeslough
Derrybeg
Dunfanaghy
Falcarragh
Gortahork
Kilmacrenan
Letterkenny
Meenlaragh
Milford
Rathmelton
Rathmullan
Tory Island

References

Baronies of County Donegal